Christopher Willis (born 21 August 1978) is an Australian-born British composer. He is the composer of the music to the 2013 Disney Mickey Mouse Shorts, and co-composer (with Rupert Gregson-Williams) of the music to the HBO comedy series Veep. He has also written music for a number of film scores (credited with "additional music") with several other film composers including Carter Burwell,  Harry Gregson-Williams, and Henry Jackman. His filmography includes The Twilight Saga: Breaking Dawn – Part 2 (2012), Winnie the Pooh (2011), X-Men: First Class (2011), Shrek Forever After (2010), Grown Ups (2010), You Don't Mess With The Zohan (2008) and the television series Veep. His score for The Death of Stalin (2017) was shortlisted along with 14 others for the Academy Award for Best Original Score.

His concert music includes a piece written specially for The BBC Proms in 2010 entitled Mashup. The music is a written-out mashup of other pieces from the programme of the concert at which it was premiered. He has also composed music for educational purposes including Boom Town for chamber orchestra and young children, which was part of the 2012 Summer Olympics in London.

He is also a musicologist specializing in eighteenth-century music, especially Domenico Scarlatti, although he has written about other subjects including American minimalism. He holds a Ph.D. from the University of Cambridge and has written a number of scholarly articles, including a chapter to the book Domenico Scarlatti Adventures: Essays to Commemorate the 250th Anniversary of His Death, and articles in the journals Early Music and Eighteenth-Century Music.

Filmography

Feature films

Television

References

External links
 
 Piano music by Christopher Willis reviewed
 Christopher Willis on SoundCloud

1978 births
Living people
Animation composers
Annie Award winners
British film score composers
British male film score composers
Emmy Award winners
Alumni of Clare College, Cambridge